River Valley Technical Center is a career and technical school in Springfield, Vermont, USA. It offers an education that prepares students to be career- and college-ready. Students learn technical skills in their program areas and employability skills that prepare them for the workplace. Academic skills including mathematics, reading and writing, science and social studies are taught as part of the program area curriculum. Many of the programs offer post-secondary credit, industry-recognized credentials and leadership opportunities.

The center enrolls students from Bellows Falls Union High School, Black River High School, Compass School, Green Mountain Union High School, Fall Mountain Regional High School and Springfield High School. It also enrolls homeschooled students, recent high school graduates and students from private schools.

Until the 2007-2008 school year, the center was under the jurisdiction of the Springfield School District, until all towns which send students to the center voted to separate from the Springfield School District and fall under the purview of a newly created district.

Curriculum
The curriculum includes programs in a variety of fields. In addition to professional educators, many class instructors are professionals who have vast experience in their fields.  A credit-value is developed for each course which is recommended by a student's sending school.

The available programs are:

Advanced Manufacturing
Audio Video Production
Business Management
Carpentry
Criminal Justice
Culinary Arts
Engineering
Hands-On Computer Systems
Health Careers
Horticulture and Natural Resources
Human Services
Industrial Trades
Technology Essentials
Integrated Pre-Technical Studies

External links

Schools in Windsor County, Vermont
Public high schools in Vermont